William Blount (1749–1800) was a U.S. Senator from Tennessee from 1796 to 1797, also serving in the Tennessee State Senate. Senator Blount may also refer to:

Clarence W. Blount (1921–2003), Maryland State Senate
David Blount (born 1967), Mississippi State Senate